Ron Larson (born 1941), is a mathematics professor at Penn State Erie, The Behrend College, Pennsylvania.

Ron Larson may also refer to:

Ron Larson (artist)  art director, album cover designer and graphic artist

See also
Ronnie Larsen, playwright